Einar Folke Emanuel Sandström (27 September 1892 – 18 August 1962) was a Swedish Army officer and horse rider who competed in the 1936 Summer Olympics. He and his horse Pergola finished 15th in the individual dressage and won a bronze medal with the Swedish dressage team.

Sandström became major in the reserve in 1941.

Awards and decorations
Knight of the Order of the Sword
Knight First Class of the Order of the White Rose of Finland

References

1892 births
1962 deaths
Swedish Army officers
Swedish dressage riders
Olympic equestrians of Sweden
Swedish male equestrians
Equestrians at the 1936 Summer Olympics
Olympic bronze medalists for Sweden
Olympic medalists in equestrian
Knights of the Order of the Sword
People from Alingsås Municipality
Medalists at the 1936 Summer Olympics
Sportspeople from Västra Götaland County